Helen Morgenthau Fox (May 27, 1884 – January 13, 1974) was an American botanist and author of popular gardening books.

Biography

Helen Morgenthau Fox was born in New York City, New York. Her father was United States Ambassador to Turkey Henry Morgenthau, Sr., and her brother was Henry Morgenthau, Jr. In 1905, Fox graduated from Vassar College before studying at the New York Botanical Garden (NYBG) She married architect, banker, and landscape artist Mortimer J. Fox in 1906. During her adult life, she lived in Bedford, New York on a 20-acre property named High Low Farm.

Fox wrote a variety of gardening books from 1927 to 1973 and wrote articles for The New York Times. In 1949, She translated French naturalist and missionary, Abbe David's journals from his trip to China in 1866 to 1869. In 1934, Fox helped design and guide the herb garden at The Cloisters in Manhattan. She lectured extensively on gardening around the world, speaking for the United States Department of Agriculture and at garden clubs and universities. Fox was also featured on radio and television programs.

Fox died in Mount Kisco, New York.

Selected publications

Gardens and Gardening, a Selected List of Books (1927)
Garden Cinderellas: How to Grow Lilies in the Garden (1928)
Patio Gardens (1929)
What Spain Can Teach Us About Gardening (1929)
Jean C. N. Forestier (1931)
Gardens to See in Travels Abroad (1931)
More Gardens To See When Traveling Abroad' (1931)Gardens in Hawaii (1931)Gardening with Herbs for Flavor and Fragrance (1933)Low Growing Native American Flowering Trees (1944)The Aging Garden (1948)Abbe David's Diary (1949)A visit to California Gardens and Gardeners (1957)André Le Nôtre: Garden Architect to Kings (1962)Adventure in My Garden (1965)Gardening with Herbs (1970)Gardening for Good Eating (1973 reprint of 1943 edition)The Years in my Herb Garden'' (1973)

References

1884 births
1974 deaths
Scientists from New York City
American garden writers
American women botanists
American botanists
American science writers
American people of German-Jewish descent
Jewish American writers
Morgenthau family
Women science writers
20th-century American women scientists
20th-century American women writers
20th-century American scientists
American women non-fiction writers
20th-century American non-fiction writers